An estate is a large parcel of land under single ownership, which would historically generate income for its owner.

British context

In the UK, historically an estate comprises the houses, outbuildings, supporting farmland, and woods that surround the gardens and grounds of a very large property, such as a country house, mansion, palace or castle. It is the modern term for a manor, but lacks a manor's now-abolished jurisdiction. 

The "estate" formed an economic system where the profits from its produce and rents (of housing or agricultural land) sustained the main household, formerly known as the manor house. Thus, "the estate" may refer to all other cottages and villages in the same ownership as the mansion itself, covering more than one former manor. Examples of such great estates are Woburn Abbey in Bedfordshire, England, and Blenheim Palace, in Oxfordshire, England, built to replace the former manor house of Woodstock. In a more urban context are the "Great Estates" in Central London such as the Grosvenor and Portman, which continue to generate significant income through rent.

Before the 1870s, these estates often encompassed several thousand acres, generally consisting of several farms let to tenants; the great house was supplied with food from its own home farm (for meat and dairy) and a kitchen garden (for fruit and vegetables). However the agricultural depression from the 1870s onwards and the decline of servants meant that the large rural estates declined in social and economic significance, and many of the country houses were destroyed. 

In modern British English, the term "estate" has been generalised to any large parcel of land under single ownership, such as a housing estate or industrial estate.

In the United States

Large country estates were traditionally found in New York's Long Island, and Westchester County, the Philadelphia Main Line, Maine's Bar Harbor on Mount Desert Island, and other affluent East Coast enclaves; and the San Francisco Bay Area, early Beverly Hills, California, Montecito, California, Santa Barbara, California and other affluent West Coast enclaves.  All these regions had strong traditions of large agricultural, grazing, and productive estates modeled on those in Europe.  However, by the late 1940s and early 1950s, many of these estates had been demolished and subdivided, in some cases resulting in suburban villages named for the former owners, as in Baxter Estates, New York.

An important distinction between the United States and England is that "American country estates, unlike English ones, rarely, if ever, supported the house."  American estates have always been about "the pleasures of land ownership and the opportunity to enjoy active, outdoor pursuits." Although some American estates included farms, they were always in support of the larger recreational purpose.

Today, large houses on lots of at least several acres in size are often referred to as "estates", in a contemporary updating of the word's usage.  Most contemporary American estates are not large enough to include significant amounts of self-supporting productive agricultural land, and the money for their improvement and maintenance usually comes from fortunes earned in other economic sectors besides agriculture. They are distinguished from ordinary middle-class American houses by sheer size, as well as their landscaping, gardens, outbuildings, and most importantly, recreational structures (e.g., tennis courts and swimming pools).  This usage is the predominant connotation of "estate" in contemporary American English (when not preceded by the word "real"), which is why "industrial estate" sounds like an oxymoron to Americans, as few wealthy persons would deliberately choose to live next to factories.

Traditional American estates include:
Biltmore, Asheville, North Carolina; estate of George Washington Vanderbilt II
Hearst Castle, Central Coast of California; estate of William Randolph Hearst
Castle Hill, Ipswich, Massachusetts; estate of Richard Teller Crane Jr.
Meadow Farm, East Islip, New York; estate of H. B. Hollins (demolished)
Westbrook, Great River, New York; estate of William Bayard Cutting
Coe Hall, Oyster Bay, New York; estate of William R. Coe
Indian Neck Hall, Oakdale, New York; estate of Frederick Gilbert Bourne
Inisfada, Manhasset, New York; estate of Nicholas Brady
Idle Hour, Oakdale, New York; estate of William Kissam Vanderbilt
Oheka Castle, Cold Spring Harbor, New York; estate of Otto Hermann Kahn
Harold Lloyd Estate, 'Greenacres' Beverly Hills, California; estate of Harold Lloyd
Filoli, Woodside, California; estate of William Bowers Bourn II.
Riven Rock, Montecito, California; estate of Stanley and Katharine McCormick (demolished)
Carolands, Hillsborough, California; estate of Harriett Pullman Carolan (daughter of George Pullman)
Dumbarton Oaks, Georgetown, Washington, D.C.; estate of the Woods—Bliss Family, landscape architecture by Beatrix Farrand

See also

 English country house
 Estate map
 Finca
 Gentry
 Hacienda
 Patroon
 Real estate
 Real estate business
 Real estate development
 Real estate bubble
 Villa

References